Thomas Alford may refer to:

 Thomas Alford (Queensland pioneer) (1817–1864), pioneer in the Drayton/Toowoomba area, Australia 
 Thomas Alford (Taabinga Station), owner of the Taabinga Station, son of Thomas Alford, Drayton/Toowoomba pioneer
 Thomas Wildcat Alford, Native American writer
 Thomas Dale Alford (1916–2000), ophthalmologist and politician from Arkansas, United States